The following is about the qualification rules and the quota allocation for the luge at the 2022 Winter Olympics.

Qualification rules
The qualification is based on the cumulative points of the Olympic Season from 1 July 2021 to January 10, 2022. A total of 106 quota spots are available to athletes to compete at the games. A maximum 35 men, 35 women, and 18 doubles teams will initially qualify.  Each NOC can enter a maximum of three men, three women, and two doubles. The host nation has the right to enter a competitor in the men's, doubles, and women's competitions provided they meet minimum standards. The team relay will consist of all nations who can form a relay team from qualified athletes.

In the men's singles, all nations with an athlete in the top 50 qualified one slot. If there were remaining spots left, the second best athlete of each nation in the top 32 was awarded an additional quota, with the third best being awarded a quota if there were any remaining spots. For the women, instead of the top 50, it was top 40, and in the doubles it was top 25, with the second sled being required to be in the top 28 (if any spots were left). Each country could enter a maximum of 10 athletes (three each in the singles events and two doubles sleds for a total of four athletes).

On December 17, 2021, the International Luge Federation announced that the qualification system was changed. The qualification system was changed due to training runs being cancelled at the first World Cup, and equipment not being delivered to the following World Cups. The new system will see athletes qualify based on their top four results during the World Cup season, (as opposed to the previous all seven results counting).

Quota allocation

Current summary
Standings after all 7 races

Men's
NOCs ranked within the top 50 on the Olympic Season World Cup Ranking List qualify one sled. If there is less than 35 qualifiers then NOCs with a second sled ranked in the top 32 may qualify.  If there is still less than 35, then NOCs with a third sled ranked in the top 32 may qualify a third sled.

Doubles
NOCs ranked within the top 25 on the Olympic Season World Cup Ranking List qualify one sled. If there is less than 18 qualifiers then NOCs with a second sled ranked in the top 28 may qualify.

Women's
NOCs ranked within the top 40 on the Olympic Season World Cup Ranking List qualify one sled. If there is less than 35 qualifiers then NOCs with a second sled ranked in the top 32 may qualify.  If there is still less than 35, then NOCs with a third sled ranked in the top 32 may qualify a third sled.

Team relay

References

Qualification for the 2022 Winter Olympics
Qualification